Johan Andrés Mojica Palacio (born 21 August 1992) is a Colombian professional footballer who plays for La Liga club Villarreal and the Colombia national team. Mainly a left-back, he can also play as a winger.

Mojica began his football career in Colombia with second division side Academia before joining league counterpart Llaneros in 2012. Over the next two years, he had loan periods with Deportivo Cali and La Liga side Rayo Vallecano. In 2014, Mojica was permanently signed by Rayo, however, he did not play much games with the club and was loaned out that same year to Real Valladolid. Notably, Mojica was included in the 2014–15 Segunda División Team of the Year for his efforts with Valladolid. In January 2017, he was loaned to second-tier club Girona FC, where he helped the team achieve promotion to the first division. Consequently, Mojica's loan was renewed for a further year and he eventually signed a four year contract with the club in June 2018. He was loaned out to Serie A side Atalanta in September 2020, with a buyout clause. In January 2021, his loan with the club was terminated early and Mojica returned to Spain on loan, joining La Liga side Elche CF for the remainder of that season. That same year, Mojica was bought outright by Elche and signed a three year contract with the club. In September 2022, he moved to Villarreal on a four-year contract. 

Mojica made his senior debut for Colombia in March 2015, and was chosen by José Pékerman for the 2018 FIFA World Cup.

Club career

Colombia
Born in Cali, Mojica began his career with Academia FC, making his first team debut on 25 June 2011, against Expreso Rojo. Johan Mojica was a part of the Deportivo Cali youth system, known for its output of international players.

He retained a starting spot before moving to Llaneros FC. In January 2013, Mojica signed with Deportivo Cali. On 30 March, he made his Categoría Primera A debut, against Itagüí.

Rayo Vallecano
On 5 July 2013, Mojica moved to Spain, signing a one-year loan contract with Rayo Vallecano. He made his official – and La Liga – debut on 15 September, coming on as a 69th minute substitute for Sebastián Fernández in a 5–0 away loss against Málaga.

Mojica featured in 12 matches during the campaign, as the Madrid side achieved a comfortable mid-table finish. On 28 July 2014, he signed a permanent four-year deal with Rayo, and was immediately loaned to Real Valladolid.

Mojica was also converted to a left winger during the process,<ref>[http://www.marca.com/2014/11/06/futbol/futbol_internacional/colombia/1415294812.html Mojica: "Soy jugador de Primera" (Mojica: "I am a Primera player)]; Marca, 6 November 2014 </ref> and also scored a brace in a 7–0 home routing over FC Barcelona B on 21 December 2014. On 6 August 2015, his loan was extended for another year.

Girona
On 31 January 2017, Mojica was loaned to fellow second tier club Girona FC until the end of the season. After achieving promotion to the main category, his loan was renewed for a further year on 18 August.

On 29 June 2018, Mojica was bought outright by the Catalans, signing a contract until 2022.

Atalanta (loan)
On 22 September 2020, Mojica was loaned to Serie A side Atalanta for the season, with a buyout clause. He made a total of 13 appearances for the club and did not score any goals.

Elche
On 15 January 2021, Mojica's loan to Atalanta was terminated early, and he was loaned to La Liga side Elche for the remainder of the 2020–21 season. On 8 August, he signed a permanent three-year deal with the club.

Villarreal
On 1 September 2022, Mojica signed a four-year contract with fellow top tier side Villarreal.

International career
On 22 March 2015, Mojica was called up by Colombia national team for the friendlies against Bahrain and Kuwait. He made his international debut four days later, coming on as a second half substitute for Juan Fernando Quintero and scoring the fifth in a 6–0 win. 

He was included in Colombia’s squad for the 2018 FIFA World Cup. He started in all of Colombia's matches, including the round of 16 match against England, where Colombia lost 3–4 on penalties following a 1–1 draw.

Career statistics
Club

InternationalScores and results list Colombia's goal tally first, score column indicates score after each Mojica goal''.

References

External links

Profile at the Villarreal CF website

1992 births
Living people
Colombian people of African descent
Footballers from Cali
Colombian footballers
Association football defenders
Association football wingers
Categoría Primera A players
Categoría Primera B players
Academia F.C. players
Llaneros F.C. players
Deportivo Cali footballers
La Liga players
Segunda División players
Rayo Vallecano players
Real Valladolid players
Girona FC players
Elche CF players
Villarreal CF players
Serie A players
Atalanta B.C. players
Colombian expatriate footballers
Colombian expatriate sportspeople in Spain
Colombian expatriate sportspeople in Italy
Expatriate footballers in Spain
Expatriate footballers in Italy
Colombia international footballers
2018 FIFA World Cup players